Gioachino Colombo (1903–1988) was an Italian automobile engine designer. Colombo was born in Legnano. He began work as an apprentice to Vittorio Jano at Alfa Romeo.

In 1937, Colombo designed the 158 engine for the Alfetta and caught the attention of Enzo Ferrari. Ferrari asked Colombo to design a small V12 for use in the new Ferrari marque's racing and road cars. The first Ferrari-Colombo engine appeared on 11 May 1947. Colombo's great work for Ferrari was a tiny 1.5 litre V12, first used in the Tipo 125, 159, and then 166 sports cars. This engine, known in Ferrari circles as the "Colombo engine", was produced for road cars and endurance racing cars for more than 40 years in displacements up to 4.8 L. These included the  3.0 litre Ferrari 250 racing, sports, and GT cars.

Colombo's engine was not as successful in Formula One racing. After stunning early success in the 166, the engine was supercharged for use in Formula One but failed to perform well. Ferrari hedged his bets, as he often did, by bringing on competing designer Aurelio Lampredi to create a large naturally aspirated V12, which replaced Colombo's. Later, Colombo's former mentor, Vittorio Jano, came to Ferrari and displaced the work of both men.

Colombo left Ferrari in 1950 and returned to Alfa Romeo, where he oversaw that company's racing efforts - including the success that year of Nino Farina and, in 1951, Juan-Manuel Fangio. In late 1952, Colombo turned to Maserati where he created the 250F Grand Prix car. Two years later, Colombo headed to newly restarted Bugatti to work on the 251. He then worked for MV Agusta in 1957-1970.

Colombo died in Milan in 1988.

References

 

1903 births
1988 deaths
People from Legnano
Alfa Romeo people
Maserati people
Ferrari people
Italian automotive engineers
Formula One engine engineers
Italian motorsport people